The following is a list of characters from Every Move You Make, a police procedural television drama produced by TVB.

Main Characters

CID unit members

Linus Yiu
Bowie Lam portrays Linus Yiu Hok-sum (姚學琛), the unit's Senior Inspector. He studied microexpressions and applied psychology at an unspecified university in the United States for half a year before returning to Hong Kong as West Kowloon Police Department's new CID senior inspector. His addition to the unit sparks mixed reactions from the team members, especially Chow Fun, who disapproves his methods of investigation, slamming them as ridiculous methods. Hok-sum, however, does not seem to mind Chow Fun's obvious lack of respect and continues to peacefully and productively work with the unit members. He quickly befriends Ma-dam, who later becomes his love interest.

Phoenix Yip
Kristal Tin portrays Phoenix Yip Chin-ting (葉展婷), nicknamed Ma-dam, the unit's Station Sergeant. Ma-dam is known for being the caretaker and nanny of the unit, thus members of the unit (as well as the rest of the police department) gave her the nickname "Ma-dam", with the "ma" representing "mom". Throughout the drama, the story depicts her going through a divorce. Her husband, Raymond, files for divorce due to irreconcilable differences, and applies for full custody of their son, Jacky.

Trevor Ho
Bosco Wong portrays Trevor Ho Lai-yin (何禮賢), nicknamed Chow Fun, the unit's Sergeant. He initially disapproves of Hok-sum's methods of using microexpression interpretation and other observation skills to investigate cases, but later finds these skills useful after he begins dating Hok-sum's younger half-sister, Perlie.

Mak Wing-hei
Lai Lok-yi portrays Mak Wing-hei (麥永希), known as Hei, is the jokester cop of the unit. He vocally expresses his love for rich women, and consistently bickers with Fly, his partner-in-crime. He later realizes his feelings for Fly after he breaks up with his rich celebrity girlfriend.

Wu Hau-ying
Lorretta Chow portrays Wu Hau-ying (胡巧瑩),  nicknamed Fly. She develops a one-sided crush on Hei ever since she joined the CID unit and became Hei's partner-in-crime. To hide her feelings, she constantly bickers with Hei. Hok-sum and Ma-dam notices her comfortable body language around Hei, and they decide to help with her relationship with Hei.

Kan Ho-ming
Jack Hui portrays Kan Ho-ming (簡浩明), known as Ming, is the hard-working cop of the unit. He is impressed with Hok-sum's intelligence and talent, and is always opened to learning his skills.

Ching family

Ching Shiu-on
Lau Kong portrays Ching Siu-on (程兆安), the Ching family's eldest son. He is the largest shareholder of family-owned Tai Hung To Restaurant.

Lo Sui-heung
Fung So-bor portrays Lo Sui-heung (盧瑞香), Siu-on's wife.

Ching Yin-ha
Helen Ma portrays Ching Yin-ha (程燕霞), the Ching family's eldest daughter.

Ching Yin-ping
Mannor Chan portrays Ching Yin-ping (程燕萍), the Ching family's youngest daughter.

Ching Shiu-hong
Yu Yang portrays Ching Siu-hong (程兆康), the Ching family's youngest son. He is Hok-sum's stepfather and Perlie's biological father.

Chung Sau-han
Susan Tse portrays Chung Sau-han (鍾秀嫻), Siu-hong's wife. She is Hok-sum and Perlie's biological mother.

Ching Sau-yip
Tsui Wing portrays Ching Sau-yip (程守業), Siu-on and Sui-heung's son.

Perlie Ching
Aimee Chan portrays Perlie Ching Bui-yee (程貝兒), Hok-sum's younger half-sister who works as a public relations specialist at the police department. She is the girlfriend of Trevor Ho.

Kelvin Cheung
Matthew Ko portrays Kelvin Cheung Chi-kit (張志傑), Yin-ha's son.

Criminal cases

The murder of Annie Leung (Ep. 1–2)

The murder of Donald Lai (Ep. 3–Ep. 5)

The rape of Emily Chow and the murder of Katie Lam (Ep. 5–Ep. 7)

The murder of Wong Chun-yu (Ep. 8–Ep. 11)

The murder of Tsang Wing-sing and the swindling of Swindler Group (Ep. 11-15)

The murder of triad leaders (Ep. 16-20) 

Every Move You Make
Every Move You Make